The Garton Toy Company was founded by Eusebius Bassingdale in Sheboygan, Wisconsin. Garton manufactures sleds, scooters, pedal cars, tricycles, and coaster wagons. 

Part or all of the building the Garton Toy Company was housed in was designed by architect William C. Weeks.  It was listed on the National Register of Historic Places in 2000. The building has since been converted into an apartment complex by Milwaukee-based Gorman & Company.

Garton Family Foundation 
Established in 1943, the foundation awards grants to local educational institutes and organizations in Sheboygan County, Wisconsin.

References

Industrial buildings and structures on the National Register of Historic Places in Wisconsin
Modern Movement architecture
Industrial buildings completed in 1930
Sheboygan County, Wisconsin
Defunct toy manufacturers
Toy companies of the United States
National Register of Historic Places in Sheboygan County, Wisconsin